Always On My Mind is a single by Norwegian singer Adelén. It was released by Sony Music Entertainment Norway as her third single on March 14, 2014. It was only released in Norway. Like her previous singles, this single includes also preferences from Mediterranean music style.

Music video
The music video was released on YouTube on March 14, 2014. The video begins as Adelén standing in a dark place. In the next scenes, Adelén is shown singing and dancing. Another scene, Adelén is playing in the spray of a fire hydrant. In the next scene, Adelén is later shown singing and dancing with the backup dancers. Another scene, Adelén is holding balloons. The scenes are shown repeatedly throughout the video.

Track listings

Charts

Release history

References

2014 songs
2014 singles
Songs written by Andreas Romdhane
Songs written by Ina Wroldsen
Songs written by Josef Larossi
Song recordings produced by Quiz & Larossi